Great Neck Village High School (also known as Village School or VS) is an American long-established public alternative school.  It is a member of Coalition of Essential Schools and is located in the village of Great Neck, New York, serving students in grades 8 through 12. Village School is one of three high schools in the Great Neck School District, which includes Great Neck North High School and Great Neck South High School. Village School offers its 39 students an outdoor education program, college preparatory program, and inclusion of students with disabilities.

Co-founder Arnie Langberg has been called "one of the most important pioneers in the field of public alternative education."

Village School is home to the newspaper 'The Villager.

As of the 2014-15 school year, the school had an enrollment of 48 students and 6.0 classroom teachers (on an FTE basis), for a student–teacher ratio of 8.0:1. There were 3 students (6.3% of enrollment) eligible for free lunch and none eligible for reduced-cost lunch.

Students
Students who enroll must be considered at risk academically for an array of reasons. The students must be in danger of getting lost in Great Neck’s two large, comprehensive high schools or becoming overwhelmed by their large high schools.  Students may have social and emotional problems. The students may also face anxiety and difficulties with focus and organization. In the Village School’s low-key approach, these issues can be dealt with easily. Students who may have felt lost and isolated in a large school often thrive in the smaller and more personalized setting of the Village School. In the 2010-2011 school year, 39 students attended Village School. However, Village School can enroll up to 50 students. About fifty percent of students qualify for special education.

Demographics
The student body in the school year of 2010-2011 consists of:
 0   American Indian or Alaska Native students or 0% of the student body
 2  Black or African American students or 5% of the student body
 4  Hispanic or Latino students or 10% of the student body
 5 Asian or Native Hawaiian/Other Pacific Islander students or 13% of the student body
 28 White students or 72% of the student body
 0   Multiracial students or 0% of the student body

Notable alumni 
Nikki Blonsky, actress; transferred to the school in her sophomore year.
 Jesse Friedman, who with his father Arnold was the subject of the child-molestation case documented in Capturing the Friedmans.

References

External links
 Great Neck Public School official site
 Great Schools Web site information on Great Neck Village High School

Coalition of Essential Schools
Great Neck Peninsula
Alternative schools in the United States
Educational institutions established in 1971
Public high schools in New York (state)
Schools in Nassau County, New York